Grojec or Grójec may refer to:
Grojec, Chrzanów County in Lesser Poland Voivodeship (south Poland)
Grójec, a town in Masovian Voivodeship (east-central Poland)
Grójec, Greater Poland Voivodeship (west-central Poland)
Grojec, Oświęcim County, a village in Lesser Poland Voivodeship, (south Poland)
Grójec, Przasnysz County in Masovian Voivodeship (east-central Poland)
Grójec, Świętokrzyskie Voivodeship (south-central Poland)
Grojec, Silesian Voivodeship (south Poland)